Andrew George Davies (born 15 May 1962) is a former English cricketer.  Davies was a right-handed batsman who fielded as a wicket-keeper.  He was born at Altrincham, Cheshire.

Davies made his first-class debut for Cambridge University against Essex in 1982.  Davies played 21 further first-class matches for the university, the last of which came against Essex in 1989. In his 22 first-class matches, he scored 494 runs at a batting average of 19.00, with a high score of 69.  This came against Surrey in 1984. Behind the stumps, he took 28 catches and made 4 stumpings.

He made his List A debut for Combined Universities in the 1983 Benson & Hedges Cup against Surrey.  He played a further 8 List A matches for Combined Universities, the last coming against Essex in the 1985 Benson & Hedges Cup. In his 9 List A matches, he scored 68 runs at an average of 13.60, with a high score of 20.  Behind the stumps, he took 12 catches and made 2 stumpings.

Davies played a single Minor Counties Championship match for Buckinghamshire against Wales Minor Counties. His uncle's, Roy Davies and Haydn Davies, both played first-class cricket for Glamorgan.

References

External links
Andrew Davies at ESPNcricinfo
Andrew Davies at CricketArchive

1962 births
Living people
People from Altrincham
English cricketers
Cambridge University cricketers
Buckinghamshire cricketers
British Universities cricketers
Wicket-keepers